Live 1980 is a live album by American rock musician Sammy Hagar, recorded in 1980 on tour for his then-newest album, Danger Zone and released in 1983. 

The album mainly contains tracks from Danger Zone and its predecessor, Street Machine. It was released by Capitol Records after the success of Hagar's Geffen-era releases, Standing Hampton and Three Lock Box.

Song information
While every version of this release has the track listing as noted below, the song "In the Night" continues into the next track "The Danger Zone". The rest of "The Danger Zone" is a Gary Pihl keyboard solo. "The Danger Zone", as it appears on the Danger Zone album, is not represented on this live release.

Track listing

Reissues
The 1996 One Way Records re-release includes a bonus live track, "Someone Out There", which has not been released elsewhere.

Personnel
Sammy Hagar – lead vocals, rhythm guitar
Gary Pihl – lead guitar, keyboards, backing vocals
Bill Church – bass guitar, backing vocals
Chuck Ruff – drums, backing vocals

Versions
Capitol Records (US LP): SN-16376
Capitol Records (Japan LP): ECS-63048
Capitol Records (Spain LP): 064 7122991
Capitol Records (Germany LP): 1C 064 7122991
Capitol Records (US CD): CDP 7 48432 2
One Way Records (1996 US Reissue): 72438 19093 24

References

Sammy Hagar albums
1983 live albums
Capitol Records live albums